Jashoda Parmar is a Member of Legislative assembly from Jotana constituency in Gujarat for its 12th legislative assembly.

References

Living people
Gujarat MLAs 2007–2012
Women in Gujarat politics
21st-century Indian women politicians
21st-century Indian politicians
Bharatiya Janata Party politicians from Gujarat
Year of birth missing (living people)